D125 is a state road on Dugi Otok Island in Croatia connecting the D109 state road to Zaglav ferry port, from where Jadrolinija passenger ferries fly to the mainland, docking in Zadar and the D407 state road.

The road, as well as all other state roads in Croatia, is managed and maintained by Hrvatske ceste, a state-owned company.

Road junctions and populated areas

Sources

State roads in Croatia
Transport in Zadar County
Dugi Otok